Eugénie Mérieau (born 1986) is a French political scientist and constitutionalist, specialising in politics of Thailand, authoritarian constitutionalism and legal transplants. She is an associate professor (maître de conférences) of Public Law at the Paris 1 Panthéon-Sorbonne University.

Life and work 
Mérieau studied Law at the Paris 1 University (Panthéon-Sorbonne), Political Science at the Sciences Po, and Thai studies at the National Institute for Oriental Languages and Civilizations (INALCO) in Paris. She worked as a researcher at the King Prajadhipok's Institute in Bangkok, consultant for the Asia-Pacific Office of the International Commission of Jurists, research fellow at Sciences Po in Paris and Thammasat University in Bangkok, as well as visiting scholar at the Centre for Asian Legal Studies, National University of Singapore. In 2017 she completed her Ph.D. at INALCO with a thesis on "Thai Constitutionalism and Legal Transplants: a study of Kingship" which won the 2018 Best Dissertation in Law and Politics prize of the Chancellery of the Universities of Paris.

From 2017 to 2019 she was a research fellow at the Alexander von Humboldt Chair of Comparative Constitutionalism, University of Göttingen. In 2019–2020, she was a visiting researcher at the Institute for Global Law and Policy (IGLP), Harvard Law School, and subsequently a post-doctoral fellow at the Centre for Legal Theory, National University of Singapore. She has commented on the political situation and developments in Thailand for international media, including The Conversation, The New York Times, and The Atlantic.

In 2021, she was appointed maître de conférences (associate professor) at the Sorbonne Law School, Paris 1 University, where she teaches constitutional law. Her research interest is focused on illiberal constitutionalism, globalisation of law, rule of law and state of emergency, epistemology and methology of comparative law, as well as Asian constitutional laws.

Eugénie Mérieau is married to the Thai constitutional law scholar and politician Piyabutr Saengkanokkul.

Publications (selection) 
 
 (editor)

References 

Political scientists on Thailand
Scholars of constitutional law
Scholars of comparative law
French legal scholars
Women legal scholars
Academic staff of Pantheon-Sorbonne University
Sciences Po alumni
INALCO alumni
1986 births
Living people